Port Blair tehsil is one of 5 local administrative divisions of the Indian district of South Andaman, part of the Indian union territory of Andaman and Nicobar Islands.

It is a division known locally as a tehsil, roughly equivalent to a county in its range of administrative powers. Located in the Indian Ocean Andaman Islands, the tehsil of Port Blair is the largest tehsil in terms of both area and number of inhabitants,  accounting for half of the district's overall population. Its headquarters is the township also called Port Blair, the district's major urban centre and capital of the Union Territory.

References

Tehsils of the Andaman and Nicobar Islands